The Great Northern Union was a men's barbershop chorus based in the Minneapolis-St. Paul area. They performed four-part harmony in the barbershop style. Officially, they were the Hilltop, Minnesota chapter of the Barbershop Harmony Society (BHS), and were very active in competition. The chorus had won 11 medals (top 5) in BHS International Chorus competitions, including consecutive second-place silver medals in 2011 and 2012. 

The group underwent substantial changes starting in 2020, when they took on Mo Field, "the first openly gay, gender fluid woman" who began to reshape the club. GNU's focus is no longer barbershop music, and in efforts to remove perceived "toxic masculinity", the club now accepts "members of any gender".

History
The Hilltop chapter was first organized in 1985 by a dozen men in the Twin Cities area who were interested in founding a chorus based upon singing excellence and service to the community.

They won their first Land O' Lakes District (LOL) Chorus Contest in fall 1986 and made the trip to their first BHS International Chorus Contest, held in Hartford, Connecticut, in July 1987, where they placed eighth. Their infectious energy and clean sound made them the surprise of the contest. The chorus again won their district competition in fall 1987 and traveled to their second international contest in San Antonio, Texas in 1988, where they placed seventh. The chorus wasn't as successful in its third international contest and sank back to eighth place in Kansas City, Missouri behind a stronger field.

The 1990 contest in San Francisco yielded the chorus's first medal, a fifth place bronze.  This cemented the reputation of the GNU among the top choruses in the Society and set the foundation for much future success. The 1991 contest in Louisville continued the upward climb, with the chorus placing third.

In 1992, the chorus reached 100 members and took a brand new Broadway-themed package and a brand new conductor, Concordia College, Moorhead graduate Dean Haagenson, to International in New Orleans, bringing home yet another medal, placing fourth. Haagenson led the chorus to Calgary, Alberta in 1993 and brought the gentlemen another fourth place medal.

1994 marked the first time since 1989 that the chorus did not win a medal, dropping to 61 members and placing eighth behind a much improved field of competitors. After conductor Dean Haagenson's decision to retire from conducting, Roger Williams returned to the chorus and attempted to bring the group back together spiritually and musically. With half the members they had at their peak, the chorus decided not to try to win back older members but focus on improving what they had and performing a fun new package. In 1995 they went to Miami with a parody package making fun of lawyers and once again wowed the crowd, winning another medal and placing fifth. They slightly modified the package for 1996 and went to Salt Lake City, barely missing the medals and placing sixth. The next few years they hung just out of the reach of the medals, placing seventh in 1997 in Indianapolis, eighth in 1998 in Atlanta, and seventh in 1999 in Anaheim before returning to the top 5 (placing fourth) in 2000 in Kansas City, achieving their highest score and growing to 80 singers. The next two years they placed sixth. In 2002, Williams announced his final retirement.

Fall 2002 saw the debut of the chorus's new director, Peter Benson, who moved from North Dakota to take the job. The chorus did not win its district contest for the first time in chapter history, but still won a wild card invitation to Montreal in 2003, where they placed ninth. The following year they again received a wild card to Louisville and rose to seventh. Fall 2004 brought GNU back to the winner's circle in the LOL District, winning the right to compete in Salt Lake City, where they won yet another medal, placing fifth with their second highest score in the chorus's history. In July 2006, the chorus traveled to Indianapolis for their 20th consecutive appearance at the international contest (a Society record). GNU placed eighth in that competition, but continued to hold their ground as one of the top 10 barbershop choruses in the world.

Finally breaking their streak of international contest performances, the chorus opted to sit out of the competition in 2007 in Denver and 2008 in Nashville to focus on concerts in the community, a Midwest tour, and recruiting more members. In July 2009, they returned to the international stage in Anaheim and earning a third-place bronze medal, their highest yet ranking, edging out perennial medalist Sound of the Rockies from Denver by a narrow margin. Anaheim also brought GNU its highest average score yet achieved, a 92.1%.
After sitting out in 2010, GNU returned to the international stage in Kansas City and won a second-place silver medal with its "One of Those Songs" package, missing out on a gold medal by five points out of 3,000 possible. That photo finish prompted a return to international the following year in Portland, where GNU earned a second-consecutive silver medal after posting the chorus's highest average score ever, a 95.0%, with a revamped "One of Those Songs" package. After sitting out in 2013, the chorus earned a third-place medal in Las Vegas with its "Winter Wonderland" package.
Following the 2014 campaign, Director Peter Benson announced his resignation and the chorus hired Douglas Carnes in July 2015, with Scott Kvigne leading the chorus in the interim.

Outreach
In keeping with the Barbershop Harmony Society's goal to "Keep The Whole World Singing," Great Northern Union is active in reaching out to young singers in various ways.
Since 2004, GNU has played host to a collaborative festival concert with area collegiate men's choruses. The event has frequently featured performances by the involved men's choruses and recent BHS International Collegiate Quartet champions, master classes on the barbershop style taught by GNU, and a mass chorus of all those involved for a finale.
Great Northern Union also plays host to an annual Real Men Sing event that gives younger men in grades 7-12 the opportunity to sing. Participants at the all-day event form two youth choruses and give a concert at the end of the day, singing alongside GNU in the finale. GNU has been the featured performer at other Real Men Sing events in the Midwest as well.

Since 2011, GNU has organized a summer youth men's chorus called 30 Below, which features men under 30 years old joined by GNU's younger members. The 30 Below chorus performs at the annual summer "Barbershop In The Park" event in St. Paul.
GNU is an active member and participant in the month-long Northern Voice Festival, a collaborative effort of several Twin Cities-area singing ensembles that similarly aim to promote vocal music. GNU was named one of four "must-see" ensembles at the inaugural Festival Day.
In recent years, GNU has been invited to perform at a number of professional educator association events in the region, including American Choral Directors Association (ACDA) conferences and the Minnesota Music Educators Associations conference.

References

Choirs in Minnesota
Musical groups established in 1986
1986 establishments in Minnesota